Private Christopher Freemeyer (1838 – October 14, 1894) was a German-born soldier in the U.S. Army who served with the 5th U.S. Infantry during the Indian Wars. He was one of thirty-one men who received the Medal of Honor for gallantry during General Nelson A. Miles campaign against the Sioux Indians in the Montana Territory from October 1876 to January 1877.

Biography
Christopher Freemeyer was born in Bavaria, Germany in 1838. Emigrating to the United States, he enlisted in the U.S. Army in New York City, New York and joined Company D of the 5th U.S. Infantry. Freemeyer was assigned to frontier duty in the Montana Territory and took part in General Nelson A. Miles "winter campaign" against the Sioux lasting from October 21, 1876, to January 8, 1877. He distinguished himself in several engagements with the Sioux during this period, most notably, at the Battle of Cedar Creek. On April 27, 1877, Freemeyer was one of thirty-one soldiers who received the Medal of Honor for "gallantry in actions". After leaving the army, he returned to New York where he died on October 14, 1894, at the age of 56. Freemeyer was interred at Cypress Hills National Cemetery in Brooklyn.

Medal of Honor citation
Rank and organization: Private, Company D, 5th U.S. Infantry. Place and date: At Cedar Creek, etc., Mont., October 21, 1876 to January 8, 1877. Entered service at: Chicago, Ill. Birth: Germany. Date of issue: April 27, 1877.

Citation:

Gallantry in action.

See also

List of Medal of Honor recipients for the Indian Wars

References

Further reading
Konstantin, Phil. This Day in North American Indian History: Important Dates in the History of North America's Native Peoples for Every Calendar Day. New York: Da Capo Press, 2002.

External links

1838 births
1894 deaths
Bavarian emigrants to the United States
American military personnel of the Indian Wars
United States Army Medal of Honor recipients
Military personnel from New York City
United States Army soldiers
German-born Medal of Honor recipients
American Indian Wars recipients of the Medal of Honor
Burials at Cypress Hills National Cemetery